The Alice was an Australian drama television series created by Justin Monjo and Robyn Sinclair. It was set in the central outback city of Alice Springs. The program began as a successful TV movie, The Alice, that later spun off a regular series. The series proved less popular and was cancelled by the Nine Network on 28 September 2005 after a sharp decline in its ratings. The entire series and original TV movie have since been released on DVD.

Cast

 Jessica Napier – Jess Daily
 Erik Thomson – Jack Jaffers
 Caitlin McDougall – Helen Gregory
 Simon Burke – Patrick
 Patrick Brammall – Matt Marione
 Roxane Wilson – Ellie Delaney
 Brett Stiller – Toby Delaney
 Andrew McFarlane – Hugh Delaney
 Anne Louise Lambert – Heaven Daily
 Luke Carroll – Michael Anderson
 Henry Hereford – Adam Cooper

Awards and nominations

APRA-AGSC Screen Music Awards
The annual APRA-AGSC Screen Music Awards are presented by Australasian Performing Right Association (APRA) and Australian Guild of Screen Composers (AGSC) for television and film scores and soundtracks.

|-
|rowspan="2"| 2005 || The Alice (David Bridie)  || Best Music for a Mini-Series or Telemovie || 
|-
| "Pitjantjara" (Bridie, Frank Yamma) – The Alice || Best Original Song Composed for a Feature Film, Telemovie, TV Series or Mini-Series ||

See also
 List of Australian television series

References

External links
 
The Alice at Australian Screen Online

APRA Award winners
Australian drama television series
Nine Network original programming
Television shows set in the Northern Territory
Television shows set in the Outback
2005 Australian television series debuts
2006 Australian television series endings
Television series by Endemol Australia